, popularly known as Yuki, is a retired Japanese kickboxer, who competed professionally from 2003 until 2020. He is the former RISE Super Lightweight and Lightweight champion and Super Featherweight champion. Nicknamed "Mr. RISE", he was one of RISE's most notable fighters, having fought a grand total of 37 times with the organization. As of December 2012 he wand ranked the #4 lightweight kickboxer in the world by Liverkick.

Kickboxing career
Yuki made his professional debut in November 2003, with a low kick KO victory over Takayuki Nishimoto. Over the next five years, Yuki amassed a 10-8 record, finishing as a runner-up in the 2004 RISE Dead or Alive Tournament. In July 2008, at RISE 48, Yuki challenged Yuji Takeuchi for the RISE Lightweight title. He won the fight by a fourth round TKO.

Yuki was scheduled to defend his title for the first time against Kan Itabashi at RISE 52. He failed to defend his title, as Itabashi won the fight by unanimous decision.

Following this loss, Yuki went on a 5-2 run, earning himself another chance to fight for the RISE Lightweight title, as he challenged the incumbent champion Koji Yoshimoto. Yuki won the fight by a second round TKO. He was scheduled to defend his title against Yuto Watanabe at RISE 87. Yuki defeated Watanabe by a majority decision. He fought Lee Sung-hyun at RISE 91, but failed to defend for the second time, as Lee won the fight by a fourth round TKO.

Following this loss, Yuki took part in the 2013 Road to Glory Japan 65 kg Tournament. He won a unanimous decision against Mohan Dragon in the quarterfinals, and defeated Zen Fujita by TKO in the semifinals. He failed to capture the tournament however, as he suffered a TKO loss at the hands of Masaaki Noiri in the finals.

He next participated in the 2013 SHOOT BOXING 65 kg S-Cup. He beat Seiji Takahashi by TKO in the quarterfinals, but dropped a decision to Hiroaki Suzuki in the semifinals.

At RISE 97, he fought in a RISE Lightweight title eliminator tournament, being scheduled to fight Tatsuaki in the semifinals. He beat him by unanimous decision, but lost a majority decision to Shohei Asahara in the finals.

In September 2014, at RISE 101, Yuki fought Naoki for the RISE Super Lightweight title. He won the fight by unanimous decision.

Yuki fought 13 times in the next five years, going on a 5-7-1 run. In November 2020, for his retirement fight, Yuki requested a fight with the RISE Featherweight champion Tenshin Nasukawa. His request granted, the two of them met at the RISE DEAD OR ALIVE 2020 Osaka event. Nasukawa dominated the fight, knocking Yuki down once in the first round, and three times in the second fight before the referee was forced to stop the bout.

Titles and accomplishments
RISE
 2014 RISE Super Lightweight champion
 2010 RISE Lightweight champion
 2008 RISE Super Featherweight champion
 2004 RISE Dead or Alive Tournament runner-up

Professional kickboxing record

|-  style="background:#fbb;"
| 2020-11-01|| Loss ||align=left| Tenshin Nasukawa || RISE DEAD OR ALIVE 2020 Osaka ||  Osaka, Japan || TKO (3 Knockdowns/Flying knee) || 2 || 2:56
|-  style="background:#FFBBBB;"
| 2019-07-21|| Loss ||align=left| Hector Santiago || Rise World Series 2019, Semi Final || Osaka, Japan || Decision (Unanimous) || 3 || 3:00
|-  style="background:#FFBBBB;"
| 2019-03-10|| Loss ||align=left| Chan Hyung Lee || Rise World Series 2019, First Round || Tokyo, Japan || Decision || 3 || 3:00
|-  style="background:#FFBBBB;"
| 2018-11-17|| Loss ||align=left| Rodtang Jitmuangnon || RISE 129 || Tokyo, Japan || Decision (Unanimous) || 3 || 3:00
|-  style="background:#CCFFCC;"
| 2018-06-16|| Win ||align=left| Koudai Nobe || RISE 125 || Tokyo, Japan || KO (low kick) || 4 || 1:20
|-  style="background:#cfc;"
| 2018-02-25|| Win ||align=left| Yuto Tsujide || HOOST CUP KINGS KYOTO 4 || Kyoto, Japan || Ext.R Decision (Unanimous) || 4 || 3:00
|-  style="background:#c5d2ea;"
| 2017-10-15|| Draw||align=left| Darvish Kuroki || Rizin World Grand Prix 2017: Opening Round - Part 2 || Fukuoka, Japan || Decision || 3 || 3:00
|-  style="background:#FFBBBB;"
| 2017-07-17|| Loss ||align=left| Chan Hyung Lee || RISE 118 || Tokyo, Japan ||TKO (3 Knockdowns) || 2 || 2:58
|-  style="background:#f7f6a8;"
| 2017-01-28|| Ex ||align=left| Koudai Nobe || RISE 115 || Tokyo, Japan || Exhibition || 2 || 3:00
|-  style="background:#CCFFCC;"
| 2016-10-02|| Win ||align=left| Ilias El Hajoui || HOOST CUP KINGS OSAKA || Osaka, Japan || KO (Left Low Kick) || 3 || 1:54
|-  style="background:#fbb;"
| 2016-06-01|| Loss||align=left| Pietro Doorje || REBELS.43 || Tokyo, Japan || Decision (Split)|| 3 || 3:00
|-  bgcolor="#FFBBBB"
| 2016-03-26 || Loss || align=left| Hiroaki Suzuki || RISE 110 || Tokyo, Japan || Decision (Majority) || 3 || 3:00
|-  style="background:#CCFFCC;"
| 2015-11-29 || Win || align=left| Joury Smans || HOOST CUP KINGS WEST 2 || Osaka, Japan || Decision (Majority) || 3 || 3:00
|-  bgcolor="#FFBBBB"
| 2015-05-31 || Loss || align=left| Zakaria Zouggary || RISE 105 || Tokyo, Japan || TKO (Flying Knee) || 2 || 2:04
|-  bgcolor="#CCFFCC"
| 2014-12-29 || Win || align=left| Toshiki Taniyama || BLADE 1-BLADE FIGHTING CHAMPIONSHIP-BLADE FC JAPAN -61 kg || Tokyo, Japan || Ext.R Decision (Split) || 4 || 3:00
|-  style="background:#CCFFCC;"
| 2014-09-28|| Win ||align=left| Naoki|| RISE 101 || Tokyo, Japan || Decision (Unanimous) || 5 || 3:00
|-
! style=background:white colspan=9 |
|-  style="background:#fbb;"
| 2014-02-23|| Loss||align=left| MASAYA || SHOOT BOXING 2014 act.1 || Tokyo, Japan || Decision (Unanimous) || 3 || 3:00
|-  style="background:#FFBBBB;"
| 2014-01-25|| Loss ||align=left| Shohei Asahara || RISE 97 (RISE -63 kg Next Challenger, Final) || Tokyo, Japan || Decision (Majority)|| 3 || 3:00
|-  style="background:#CCFFCC;"
| 2014-01-25|| Win ||align=left| Tatsuaki || RISE 97 (RISE -63 kg Next Challenger, Semi Final) || Tokyo, Japan || Decision (Unanimous) || 3 || 3:00
|-  bgcolor="#FFBBBB"
| 2013-11-16|| Loss|| align=left| Hiroaki Suzuki || SHOOT BOXING BATTLE SUMMIT GROUND ZERO TOKYO 2013, S-cup 65 kg Japan Tournament, Semi Final || Tokyo, Japan || Decision (Unanimous)|| 3 || 3:00
|-  bgcolor="#CCFFCC"
| 2013-11-16|| Win || align=left| Seiji Takahashi || SHOOT BOXING BATTLE SUMMIT GROUND ZERO TOKYO 2013, S-cup 65 kg Japan Tournament, Quarter Final || Tokyo, Japan || TKO (2 Knockdowns) || 1 || 1:07
|-  style="background:#FFBBBB;"
| 2013-06-09 || Loss || align=left| Kosuke Komiyama || RISE 93 || Tokyo, Japan || Decision (Majority) || 3 || 3:00
|-  style="background:#FFBBBB;"
| 2013-03-10 || Loss ||align=left| Masaaki Noiri || Road to Glory Japan 65 kg Tournament, Final || Tokyo, Japan || TKO (4 Knockdowns) || 2 || 1:35 
|-
! style=background:white colspan=9 |
|-  style="background:#CCFFCC;"
| 2013-03-10 || Win ||align=left| Zen Fujita || Road to Glory Japan 65 kg Tournament, Semi Final || Tokyo, Japan || TKO (2 Knockdowns) || 2 || 2:42
|-  style="background:#CCFFCC;"
| 2013-03-10 || Win ||align=left| Mohan Dragon || Road to Glory Japan 65 kg Tournament, Quarter Final || Tokyo, Japan || Decision (Unanimous) || 3 || 3:00
|-  bgcolor="#FFBBBB"
| 2012-10-25 || Loss ||align=left| Lee Sung-hyun || RISE 91/M-1MC INFINITY.II || Japan || TKO (3 Knockdowns) || 4 || 1:58
|-
! style=background:white colspan=9 |
|-  bgcolor="#CCFFCC"
| 2012-10-25 || Win ||align=left| Javier Hernández || RISE 90 || Japan || KO (low kick) || 2 || 2:03
|-  bgcolor="#FFBBBB"
| 2012-06-22 || Loss ||align=left| Lee Sung-hyun || RISE 88 || Japan || Decision (Majority)|| 3 || 3:00
|-  bgcolor="#cfc"
| 2012-03-24 || Win||align=left| Yuto Watanabe || RISE 87 || Japan || Decision (Majority) || 5 || 3:00
|-
! style=background:white colspan=9 |
|-  style="background:#FFBBBB;"
| 2011-06-25 || Loss ||align=left| Koya Urabe || K-1 World MAX 2011 -63kg Japan Tournament Final, Quarter Finals || Tokyo, Japan || Decision (Majority) || 3 || 3:00
|-  bgcolor="#CCFFCC"
| 2010-12-19 || Win ||align=left| Koji Yoshimoto || RISE 73 || Japan || TKO (Low Kicks) || 2 || 2:09
|-
! style=background:white colspan=9 |
|-  bgcolor="#CCFFCC"
| 2010-10-03 || Win ||align=left| Naoki || RISE 71 || Japan || Ext.R Decision (Unanimous) || 4 || 3:00
|-  bgcolor="#FFBBBB"
| 2010-07-05 || Loss ||align=left| Tetsuya Yamato || K-1 World MAX 2010 –63 kg Japan Tournament, Quarter-final || Shibuya, Tokyo, Japan || KO (Left hook) || 1 || 3:03
|-  bgcolor="#CCFFCC"
| 2010-05-02 || Win ||align=left| Yuji Takeuchi || K-1 World MAX 2010 –63 kg Japan Tournament, 1st round || Japan || KO (High Kick) || 2 || 1:53
|-  bgcolor="#CCFFCC"
| 2010-01-24 || Win ||align=left| Shunsuke Oishi || RISE 61 || Japan || Ext.R Decision (Unanimous) || 4 || 3:00
|-  bgcolor="#CCFFCC"
| 2009-12-12 || Win ||align=left| Masato Oishi || BATTLE EVENT REALDEAL 14 || Japan || KO (Left Hook) || 1 || 2:44
|-  bgcolor="#CCFFCC"
| 2009-07-26 || Win ||align=left| Shoji || RISE 57 || Tokyo, Japan || KO (Left Low Kick)|| 3 || 0:48
|-  bgcolor="#FFBBBB"
| 2009-04-21 || Loss ||align=left| Masahiro Yamamoto || K-1 World MAX 2009 World Championship Tournament Final 16 || Fukuoka, Japan || Decision (unanimous) || 3 || 3:00
|-  bgcolor="#FFBBBB"
| 2009-01-31 || Loss ||align=left| Kan Itabashi || RISE 52 || Japan || Decision (Unanimous) || 5 || 3:00
|-
! style=background:white colspan=9 |
|-  bgcolor="#FFBBBB"
| 2008-11-30 || Loss ||align=left| TURBO || RISE 51 || Japan || Ext.R Decision (Unanimous) || 4 || 3:00
|-  bgcolor="#CCFFCC"
| 2008-07-04 || Win ||align=left| Yuji Takeuchi || RISE 48 THE KING OF GLADIATORs’08 || Japan || TKO (Low Kick) || 4 || 1:15
|-
! style=background:white colspan=9 |
|-  bgcolor="#CCFFCC"
| 2008-05-11 || Win ||align=left| Fire Harada || KGS R.I.S.E.46 ～THE KING OF GLADIATORs’08 || Japan || KO (Right Low Kick)|| 1 || 2:42
|-  bgcolor="#FFBBBB"
| 2007-12-16 || Loss ||align=left| Yusuke Ikei || R.I.S.E. DEAD OR ALIVE TOURNAMENT’07, Quarter Finals || Japan || KO (Left Knee to the Head) || 2 || 0:25
|-  bgcolor="#CCFFCC"
| 2007-10-28 || Win ||align=left| Hideki Mizutani || R.I.S.E.-β- “L7 || Japan || Decision (Unanimous) || 3 || 3:00
|-  bgcolor="#CCFFCC"
| 2007-08-26 || Win ||align=left| Fan Jin Son || R.I.S.E.-α- “THE　FACE” || Japan || Decision (Unanimous) || 3 || 3:00
|-  bgcolor="#FFBBBB"
| 2007-06-17 || Loss ||align=left| HAYATO || R.I.S.E. FLASH to CRUSH TOURNAMENT’07 || Japan || Decision (Unanimous)|| 3 || 3:00
|-  bgcolor="#FFBBBB"
| 2007-04-12 || Loss ||align=left| Takashi Ohno || R.I.S.E. FIREBALL 1 || Japan || Decision (Majority) || 3 || 3:00
|-  bgcolor="#FFBBBB"
| 2006-12-17 || Loss ||align=left| Keiji Ozaki || R.I.S.E. DEAD OR ALIVE TOURNAMENT’06, Semi Final || Japan || TKO (Left Low Kick)|| 2 || 1:58
|-  bgcolor="#CCFFCC"
| 2006-12-17 || Win ||align=left| Tomo Kiire || R.I.S.E. DEAD OR ALIVE TOURNAMENT’06, Quarter Final || Japan || Decision (Unanimous) || 3 || 3:00
|-  bgcolor="#CCFFCC"
| 2006-09-24 || Win ||align=left| Takehiro Murahama || R.I.S.E. MIGHTY EIGHTY TOURNAMENT’06 || Japan || Decision (Unanimous)|| 3 || 3:00
|-  bgcolor="#FFBBBB"
| 2005-07-31 || Loss ||align=left| Keiji Ozaki || R.I.S.E. 27 || Japan || TKO (Corner Stoppage)|| 2 || 0:43
|-  bgcolor="#CCFFCC"
| 2005-03-12 || Win ||align=left| Kenshi || IKUSA YGZ04 ～BIRD-BASE～ || Japan || KO (Low Kick) || 3 || 1:26
|-  bgcolor="#FFBBBB"
| 2004-12-19 || Loss ||align=left| Koichi Kikuchi || R.I.S.E. DEAD OR ALIVE TOURNAMENT 04, Final || Japan || TKO (Low Kicks) || 1 || 2:26
|-
! style=background:white colspan=9 |
|-  bgcolor="#CCFFCC"
| 2004-12-19 || Win ||align=left| Yasuhito Shirasu || R.I.S.E. DEAD OR ALIVE TOURNAMENT 04, Semi Final || Japan || Decision (Unanimous) || 3 || 3:00
|-  bgcolor="#CCFFCC"
| 2004-12-19 || Win ||align=left| Masaru Abe || R.I.S.E. DEAD OR ALIVE TOURNAMENT 04, Quarter Final || Japan || KO (Low Kicks)|| 3 || 1:55
|-  bgcolor="#CCFFCC"
| 2004-09-26 || Win ||align=left| Ken || R.I.S.E. 9 || Japan || TKO (Low Kicks) || 2 || 0:42
|-  bgcolor="#FFBBBB"
| 2004-06-04 || Loss ||align=left| Koichi Sakuchi || Shoot Boxing ∞-S – Infinity-S – vol 3 || Japan || Decision (Unanimous) || 5 || 3:00
|-  bgcolor="#CCFFCC"
| 2004-04-29 || Win ||align=left| A.KAMINE || R.I.S.E. VII || Japan || Ext.R Decision (Unanimous)|| 4 || 3:00
|-  bgcolor="#FFBBBB"
| 2004-01-24 || Loss ||align=left| Hiroki Shishido || Ikusa "Future Fighter Ikusa 5 -Ran- Monkey Magic" || Tokyo, Japan || Decision (Unanimous) || 3 || 3:00
|-  bgcolor="#CCFFCC"
| 2003-11-16 || Win ||align=left| Takayuki Nishimoto || IKUSA「Young Gunners 2」 || Tokyo, Japan || KO (Low Kick) || 3 || 0:49
|-
| colspan=9 | Legend:

See also
 List of male kickboxers

References

Living people
1982 births
Flyweight kickboxers
Japanese male kickboxers
People from Fukuoka Prefecture
Sportspeople from Fukuoka Prefecture